The Solomon Islands Christian Association (SICA) is an ecumenical Christian non-governmental organisation in the Solomon Islands. The association comprises the five largest Christian churches in the country, the Anglican Church of Melanesia, the Roman Catholic Church, the South Seas Evangelical Church, the Seventh-day Adventist Church, and the United Church.

SICA organises joint religious activities and religious representation at national events, and is a national partner of UNICEF. They also work with the Christian Reformed Church of Australia to support the missionary outreach of SWIM Solomon Islands.

ISSUES OF SICA.

SICA suffers issues such as: --lacking of financial support from member churches
-people tend to lose confident in its vision/world.
SICA is  a prophetic voice to day in the Church with peoples issues such as;
- Malaita and DCCG(riot and looting,2021)
-M4D and the Solomon government,
-China issues
-The parliament debate of extension to 5years 
-Reemergence of ecumenical movement/groups
-Youth arising issues

Its functions are;

-translations
-radio programs, awareness, issuing of pamphlets.

STRUCTURE.

SICA - CHURCHES - INSTITUTIONAL (ACOM,UCSI,MEETINGS) - GRASSROOT LEVEL.

SICA, Churches create avenues for ecumenism in the. Local level and church leaders,agents of Gods MIssio Dei(Gk) (edited by Fr Stanbul Kuru,BPTC. 03/08/2022.)

History

In 1967 a meeting was convened of representatives from the various churches in the Solomon Islands, including Philip Solodia, Dominic Otuana, Goldie Vengo, Isaac Goloni, Baddeley Devesi (later the country's first Governor-General), Peter Kenilorea (later the country's first Prime Minister), Bobi Kwanairara, Leslie Piva, and Leslie Fugui, in which a decision to form an association to encourage Christian love and fellowship. A combined church service was held at St. Barnabas Cathedral in Honiara to mark the agreement. The agreement, the result of native Solomon Islanders, was also supported by churchmen of foreign origin, such as Geoff Tucker, Eddie Nash, Brian Macdonald-Milne, and Louis Morosini. The organisation quickly spread beyond Honiara.

In 1978 SICA organised the Pijin Literacy Project, as an attempt to use Pijin language as a medium for teaching literacy. The project produced a number of primers and translation work.

In August 2000, SICA organised a National Peace Conference as a reaction to the coup by the Malaita Eagle Force in June. They called for a respect of human rights and opposed blanket amnesty for armed groups involved in the conflict. The leader of the MEF expressed upset to the chairman of SICA, and according to Amnesty International was behind attacks or threats to participants in the conference. More recently, in 2005, SICA has urged a truth and reconciliation commission be organised before a human rights commission be set up.

Notes

Christianity in the Solomon Islands
Organisations based in the Solomon Islands
Christian organizations established in 1967
1967 establishments in the United Kingdom
Religious organisations based in the Solomon Islands
Christian denominations established in the 20th century
National councils of churches